In computer science, coinduction is a technique for defining and proving properties of systems of concurrent interacting objects.

Coinduction is the mathematical dual to structural induction. Coinductively defined types are known as codata and are typically infinite data structures, such as streams.

As a definition or specification, coinduction describes how an object may be "observed", "broken down" or "destructed" into simpler objects. As a proof technique, it may be used to show that an equation is satisfied by all possible implementations of such a specification.

To generate and manipulate codata, one typically uses corecursive functions, in conjunction with lazy evaluation.  Informally, rather than defining a function by pattern-matching on each of the inductive constructors, one defines each of the "destructors" or "observers" over the function result.

In programming, co-logic programming (co-LP for brevity) "is a natural generalization of logic programming and coinductive logic programming, which in turn generalizes other extensions of logic programming, such as infinite trees, lazy predicates, and concurrent communicating predicates. Co-LP has applications to rational trees, verifying infinitary properties, lazy evaluation, concurrent logic programming, model checking, bisimilarity proofs, etc." Experimental implementations of co-LP are available from The University of Texas at Dallas and in Logtalk (for examples see  ) and SWI-Prolog.

Description 
In  a concise statement is given of both the principle of induction and the principle of coinduction.  While this article is not primarily concerned with induction, it is useful to consider their somewhat generalized forms at once.  In order to state the principles, a few preliminaries are required.

Preliminaries 

Let  be a set and  be a monotone function , that is:

 

Unless otherwise stated,  will be assumed to be monotone.

 X is F-closed if 
 X is F-consistent if 
 X is a fixed point if 

These terms can be intuitively understood in the following way. Then  is F-closed when you cannot conclude anymore than you've already asserted, while  is F-consistent when all of your assertions are supported by other assertions (i.e. there are no "non-F-logical assumptions").

We can now state the principles of induction and coinduction.

Definition 

 Principle of induction: If  is F-closed, then 
 Principle of coinduction: If  is F-consistent, then

Discussion 

The principles, as stated, are somewhat opaque, but can be usefully thought of in the following way. By the principle of induction, it suffices to exhibit an F-closed set  for which the property holds. Dually, suppose you wish to show that .

Examples

Defining a set of datatypes 

Consider the following grammar of datatypes:

 

That is, the set of types includes the "bottom type" , the "top type" , and (non-homogenous) lists. These types can be identified with strings over the alphabet . Consider the function :

 

In this context,  means "the concatenation of string , the symbol , and string ."

Suppose we take  as our set of datatypes.  Using the principle of induction, we can prove the following claim:

Clearly  cannot produce an infinite string, so it turns out this set is F-closed and the conclusion follows.

Now suppose that we take  as our set of datatypes.  We would like to use the principle of coinduction to prove the following claim:

 The type 

Here  denotes the infinite list consisting of all .  To use the principle of coinduction, consider the set:

 

This set turns out to be F-consistent, and therefore .  This depends on the suspicious statement that

 

Intuitively, the argument is similar to the argument that  (see Repeating decimal).

Coinductive datatypes in programming languages 

Consider the following definition of a stream:

data Stream a = S a (Stream a)

-- Stream "destructors"
head (S a astream) = a
tail (S a astream) = astream

This would seem to be a definition that is not well-founded, but it is nonetheless useful in programming and can be reasoned about.  In any case, a stream is an infinite list of elements from which you may observe the first element, or place an element in front of to get another stream.

Relationship with F-coalgebras 

Consider the endofunctor  in the category of sets:

 
 

The final F-coalgebra  has the following morphism associated with it:

 

This induces another coalgebra  with associated morphism .  Because  is final, there is a unique morphism

 

such that

 

The composition  induces another F-coalgebra homomorphism .  Since  is final, this homomorphism is unique and therefore .  Altogether we have:

 
 

Stream as a final coalgebra 

We will show that Stream A is the final coalgebra of the functor .  Consider the following implementations:

out astream = (head astream, tail astream)
out' (a, astream) = S a astream

These are easily seen to be mutually inverse, witnessing the isomorphism.  See the reference for more details.

Relationship with Mathematical Induction 

We will demonstrate how the principle of induction subsumes mathematical induction.
Let  be some property of Natural numbers.  We will take the following definition of mathematical induction:

 

Now consider the function :

 

It should not be difficult to see that . In detail, we require:

 
That is,
 

This is precisely mathematical induction as stated.

See also
 F-coalgebra
 Corecursion
 Bisimulation
 Anamorphism
 Total functional programming

References

Further reading 
Textbooks
 Davide Sangiorgi (2012). Introduction to Bisimulation and Coinduction. Cambridge University Press.
 Davide Sangiorgi and Jan Rutten (2011). Advanced Topics in Bisimulation and Coinduction. Cambridge University Press.

Introductory texts
 Andrew D. Gordon (1994).  — mathematically oriented description
 Bart Jacobs and Jan Rutten (1997). A Tutorial on (Co)Algebras and (Co)Induction (alternate link) — describes induction and coinduction simultaneously
 Eduardo Giménez and Pierre Castéran (2007). "A Tutorial on [Co-]Inductive Types in Coq"
 Coinduction — short introduction

History
 Davide Sangiorgi. "On the Origins of Bisimulation and Coinduction", ACM Transactions on Programming Languages and Systems, Vol. 31, Nb 4, Mai 2009.

Miscellaneous
 Co-Logic Programming: Extending Logic Programming with Coinduction — describes the co-logic programming paradigm

Theoretical computer science
Logic programming
Functional programming
Category theory
Mathematical induction